Port Lansing is a United States Port of Entry located at Capital Region International Airport in DeWitt Township, adjacent to Lansing, Michigan.  The Port allows passengers and cargo to clear customs through a U.S. Customs and Border Protection Federal Inspection Station.

History

Capital Region International Airport received U.S. Port of Entry status in January 2008.  The name Port Lansing reflects this designation.  By June a U.S. Customs Inspection Station was established at the airport.  The  interim facility, near the west end of the terminal, could accommodate corporate and general aviation aircraft of up to 20 passengers per flight.  In May 2009 a permanent  $4.3 million inspection station opened at the east end of the terminal in space formerly used by Northwest Airlines for ticketing and check-in operations.  The new station is capable of processing 200 passengers per hour.

To promote increased international commerce in and around the airport, Foreign Trade Zone No. 275 was activated, effective August 21, 2009. The Foreign Trade Zone, designated by the U.S. Department of Commerce and U.S. Customs and Border Protection, is one of seven in Michigan. The trade zone includes  of property near the airport terminal and runways. The trade zone allows goods to be delivered there duty-free — with reduced, deferred, or eliminated customs fees — providing a competitive advantage to companies doing business within the trade zone.

In October 2010, Capital Region International Airport received a $1.1 million federal Economic Development Administration grant to support infrastructure construction around the airport's industrial park and nearby corporate hangars.  Improvements include the extension of water lines, the installation of water and storm sewer lines, and access road upgrades.

In November 2010, the foreign trade zone was expanded to eight Michigan counties including Clinton, Eaton, Gratiot, Ingham, Jackson, Livingston, Shiawassee, and most of Isabella county.  Companies in those eight counties can clear customs in Lansing, store freight in their own county, while utilizing tax incentives.  The first international cargo shipment arrived through Port Lansing in May 2011.

In January 2011, the airport, city of Lansing, and DeWitt Township announced a partnership with the goal of establishing an aerotropolis, designed to encourage economic development within  of the airport. The plan includes a 50-year 425 land, tax, and services agreement between the city and township.  In December 2011 the airport, city, and township received Next Michigan Development Corporation — or aerotropolis — designation from the Michigan Economic Development Corporation Strategic Fund board.

The Port Lansing Global Logistics Center, a $6 million  cargo warehouse and cross-docking facility, opened in October 2012.  The logistics center, located in a  commerce park at the southeast end of the airport, functions as a freight consolidation center, foreign trade zone, and an import/export incubator.  In March 2013, EMO Trans Customized Global Logistics opened a logistics office and warehouse operation at the logistics center.  The operation is the region's first freight forwarder and customs broker.

In November 2013, Niowave, Inc. announced plans to build a  $202 million medical isotope and radiopharmaceutical production facility in the Next Michigan Development zone at the airport.

Transportation
 Port Lansing is accessible by road from Grand River Avenue to the south (main entrance), Airport Road from the west, and DeWitt Road from the east.  The Port is close to freeways I-69 (exits 84, 85), I-96 (exit 90), I-496 (exit 3), and US 127 (exit 82B).  From downtown Lansing, drivers can follow westbound Business Loop I-96 (BL I-96) to the Port and airport.
 CATA Bus Route 14 runs between Port Lansing and downtown Lansing.  To get to East Lansing or the Michigan State University campus, riders may transfer from the Lansing downtown end of Route 14 onto Route 1, Route 4, or Route 15.
 The CSX Plymouth Subdivision railway is located at the south end of the airport.  The railway runs from Grand Rapids to Detroit.

See also

 Airport of Entry
 List of free ports
 Capital Region International Airport

References

External links
 
 
 Port Lansing at Lansing Regional Chamber of Commerce
 Foreign Trade Zone No. 275 at Lansing Regional Chamber of Commerce
 Capital Region International Airport Lansing at U.S. Customs and Border Protection

2008 establishments in Michigan
Economy of Lansing, Michigan
Transportation in Clinton County, Michigan
Transportation in Ingham County, Michigan
Transportation in Lansing, Michigan